Georges Eugène Wambst (21 July 1902 – 1 August 1988) was a French cyclist. He won the Gold Medal in Team road race  along with Armand Blanchonnet and René Hamel in the 1924 Summer Olympics.

He died on 1 August 1988.

References

External links
 
 

1902 births
1988 deaths
French male cyclists
Olympic cyclists of France
Olympic gold medalists for France
Cyclists at the 1924 Summer Olympics
Olympic medalists in cycling
People from Lunéville
Medalists at the 1924 Summer Olympics
Sportspeople from Meurthe-et-Moselle
Cyclists from Grand Est